Plymouth is a free application which provide bootsplash for Linux, which handles user interaction during the boot process. Plymouth supports animations using Direct Rendering Manager (DRM) and the KMS driver and is bundled into initrd which enables it to be launched before the file system is mounted. The program is named after Plymouth Rock, a name which symbolizes the program's role as a first point of entry for users to interact with a computer system.

Plymouth was first included in Fedora 10 "Cambridge" shipped on November 25, 2008, where it replaced Red Hat Graphical Boot (RHGB). Ubuntu includes it in the Ubuntu 10.04 LTS "Lucid Lynx" release shipped on April 29, 2010. Mandriva switched from Splashy to Plymouth with version Adélie (2010.0).

History
The development of Plymouth began in May 2007 and began under the leadership of Ray Strode. There was little support for this project until early 2008 when Fedora 10 included Plymouth in the release. Since then, Plymouth has been introduced in Mandriva Linux 2010.0 and is also introduced in Ubuntu 10.04, as well as in KDE neon.

It is now included in Ubuntu, Fedora, Debian, Linux Mint, MX Linux, Manjaro Linux, and various other Desktop Linux distributions.

See also

 Usplash
 Linux

References

External links
 https://www.freedesktop.org/wiki/Software/Plymouth/
 https://launchpad.net/plymouth

Booting
Fedora Project
Free system software
Freedesktop.org